The Belaćevac coal mine is a coal mine in Obilić in District of Pristina, Kosovo. The mine has coal reserves amounting to 5.92 billion tonnes of lignite, one of the largest lignite reserves in Europe. It produces 6.2 million tonnes of coal per year.

References 

Coal mines in Kosovo